Chrome Molly are an English hard rock band from Leicester. They formed in 1982, releasing four albums before splitting up in 1991. They re-formed in 2009.

History
The band formed in 1982, and after an early demo settled on a line-up of singer Steve Hawkins, guitarist John Antcliffe, bass guitarist Nic Wastell and drummer Chris Green. Mark Godfrey (Drums) replaced Chris Green after the release of the "You Said" EP (Bullet Becords, BOLT 10) in 1984 and prior to the recording of the band's debut album, You Can't Have It All...or Can You?, which was released in 1985. After the second album Stick It Out (1987), Antcliffe was replaced by Tim Read, and the band signed to I.R.S. Records, their first single release for the label being the cover "Shooting Me Down" which was written by Jim Lea and Noddy Holder of Slade and produced by Lea; The single received heavy airplay from BBC Radio 1 but suffered from a dispute between I.R.S. and distributors MCA Records. IRS released the third album Angst in April 1988, which included a cover version of Squeeze's "Take Me I'm Yours". They toured as support act with Alice Cooper on his Raise Your Fist And Yell tour in 1988, with guitarist Andrew Barrott added to the line-up. They moved on to the Music for Nations label for fourth album Slaphead (1990).

The band split up in 1991, although they played together as Van Halen tribute band Von Halen a few times.

The band reformed in 2009 with members of the early line-up Hawkins, Antcliffe and Wastell joined by Greg Ellis, and announced a new album, Gunpowder Diplomacy.

The band's first two albums were reissued by Cherry Red sublabel Lemon Recordings in 2010.

The band returned to the studio with Toby Jepson from Little Angels in the producers chair, the album Gunpowder Diplomacy was released  in 2013 by earMUSIC.

Johnny Antcliffe left the band in December 2014 to be replaced in 2015 by John Foottit, the band return to the studio in August 2015 to record their sixth studio album with Toby Jepson again in the production role.

The band's 6th studio album Hoodoo Voodoo was released in January 2017 on Edel records.

In September former member Andy Barrott returned to the line up replacing Sam Flint. Andy was a member in the 1980s. Andy was formerly a member of Geddes Axe, Baby Tuckoo and The Dukes of Bordello.

Discography

Albums
You Can't Have It All...or Can You? (1985), Powerstation
Stick It Out (1987), Powerstation
Angst (1988), IRS
Slaphead (1990), Music for Nations
Gunpowder Diplomacy (2013) Edel
Hoodoo Voodoo (2017), Edel

Compilations
You Can't Have It All...or Can You?/Stick It Out (2010), Lemon

Singles
"You Said" (1984), Bullet
"Take It or Leave It" (1985), Powerstation
"I Want to Find Out" (1986), Powerstation
"Take Me I'm Yours" (1988), IRS
"Thanx for the Angst" (1988), IRS
"Shooting Me Down" (1988), IRS

See also
List of new wave of British heavy metal bands

References

External links

English hard rock musical groups
Musical groups from Leicester
Musical groups established in 1984
I.R.S. Records artists
New Wave of British Heavy Metal musical groups